German submarine U-703 was a Type VIIC U-boat of Nazi Germany's Kriegsmarine deployed during the Second World War against allied shipping in the Arctic Ocean. She was a successful boat, which had a far longer service life than most other U-boats, primarily due to the restricted zone of operations in which she fought. Her main mission during the war was to target the Arctic Convoys which carried supplies to the Soviet Union from Britain. At this she was quite successful in her three years of raiding until her presumed demise in 1944.

U-703 was built at Hamburg in Northern Germany on the North Sea. She was completed in the autumn of 1941, and given to the experienced Kapitänleutnant Heinz Bielfeld to command. He took her on her working-up period in which the boat was tested and the crew trained in the Baltic Sea and around the German held coastlines, before being dispatched to Narvik in Norway for her first war patrol in April 1942.

Design
German Type VIIC submarines were preceded by the shorter Type VIIB submarines. U-381 had a displacement of  when at the surface and  while submerged. She had two shafts and two  propellers.

U-702 was fitted with five  torpedo tubes (four fitted at the bow and one at the stern), fourteen torpedoes, one  SK C/35 naval gun, 220 rounds, and a  C/30 anti-aircraft gun. The boat had a complement of between forty-four and sixty.

Service history
Enjoying the improving Arctic weather, U-703 had an unsuccessful patrol in terms of victims, but the boat began to work better as a team, and the second patrol in May reaped dividends, with the sinking of the 6,191 GRT American freighter Syros. This ship sank with eleven lives after a torpedo touched off her ammunition. The same patrol scored greater success during the disastrous end to Convoy PQ 17 on the 5 May, when she managed to sink two lone cargo ships, one of them damaged by long range German bombers beforehand. Returning to port at Narvik, U-703 was cheered by her victory, but she struggled to make further impressions during the year, as her two further patrols yielded only one victim, the British destroyer , which was fatally crippled by a torpedo near Convoy PQ 18 in September.

Following her lay-over in the winter as her home ports of Narvik, Trondheim, Hammerfest, Harstad and Bergen were all frozen, U-703 returned to the offensive, again attacking allied convoys in the Arctic Sea. Her first two patrols, in January and April were short and barren, but on the next two in July and August 1943 under her new commander Joachim Brünner, she cruised in Soviet waters in the Barents Sea and further east, catching a small Soviet armed trawler on 1 August, and larger Soviet merchant ship the next day, sinking the Sergj Kirov near Istvestij Island. These patrols had shown the vulnerability of older U-boats to newer allied countermeasures and protection, forcing the submarines to divert themselves into backwaters of the Battle of the Atlantic in order to gain any victories.

The U-703 continued operating in the spring of 1944, but she was obviously less efficient and was given duties deploying weather balloons in the Arctic Sea to test weather conditions for reports to other shipping. This was in part a result of terrible damage she received off Narvik during her first patrol of the season, when allied aircraft strafed her, killing three crew and wounding three more. Just a few days before she had claimed her only victim of the year, the Empire Tourist, which was sunk whilst part of Convoy RA 57.

Relegated to her new duties, U-703 suddenly disappeared around the 16 September 1944. She had left Narvik on her thirteenth war patrol on 14 September, in order to deploy a weather balloon in the Arctic. At the time a heavy gale was running, and it has been assumed that U-703 foundered due to heavy seas in the course of this difficult and highly technical operation. No trace of the boat and her 54 crew has ever been found.

Summary of raiding history

References

Notes

Citations

Bibliography

External links

World War II submarines of Germany
German Type VIIC submarines
Missing U-boats of World War II
U-boats commissioned in 1941
U-boats sunk in 1944
Ships built in Hamburg
1941 ships
U-boats sunk by unknown causes
Maritime incidents in September 1944